Christine Fütterer (born 14 July 1963) is a German footballer. She played in three matches for the Germany women's national football team from 1988 to 1991.

References

External links
 

1963 births
Living people
German women's footballers
Germany women's international footballers
Place of birth missing (living people)
Women's association footballers not categorized by position